The 2013 New York Jets season was the franchise's 44th season in the National Football League and the 54th overall. The Jets improved their 6–10 regular season record from 2012 and attempted to make history as the first host team to play the Super Bowl on their own home turf, alongside the New York Giants, whom they share the same home field, MetLife Stadium. However, they missed the playoffs for a third consecutive season. The Jets alternated between wins and losses during the first 9 weeks, then lost 3 straight, then won 3 of their last 4 games to finish 8–8.

Transactions

Coaching and personnel changes
Special teams coach Mike Westhoff retired on December 30, 2012. He was replaced by assistant Ben Kotwica.
Outside linebackers coach Mike Smith left the team after the season to join Texas Tech as the co-defensive coordinator.
General manager Mike Tannenbaum was fired on December 31, 2012. He was replaced on January 18, 2013 by John Idzik.
Head Strength and Conditioning coach Bill Hughan was fired on January 3, 2012. He was replaced by assistant Justus Galac.
Quarterbacks coach Matt Cavanaugh was not retained by the team. He was replaced by David Lee on January 20, 2013.
Offensive coordinator Tony Sparano was fired on January 7, 2013. He was replaced by Marty Mornhinweg on January 18, 2013.
Defensive coordinator Mike Pettine accepted an offer to become the defensive coordinator for the Buffalo Bills on January 9, 2013. Assistant defensive backs coach Jim O'Neil accepted an offer to join Pettine. Pettine was replaced by the Jets' defensive backs coach Dennis Thurman while O'Neil was replaced by assistant Brian Smith.
Linebackers coach Bob Sutton accepted an offer to become the defensive coordinator for the Kansas City Chiefs on January 11, 2013. He was replaced by Brian VanGorder.
The Jets hired Tim McDonald as their defensive backs coach to Dennis Thurman.
The Jets fired offensive line coach Dave DeGuglielmo, replacing him with assistant Mike Devlin.
Offensive quality control and assistant tight ends coach Lance Taylor accepted an offer to become the assistant wide receivers coach for the Carolina Panthers. 
The Jets hired assistant special teams coach Louie Aguiar, tight ends coach Steve Hagen, assistant offensive line coach Ron Heller, assistant strength and conditioning coach Pierre Ngo, and assistant defensive line and linebackers coach Jeff Weeks.
The Jets hired Bobby April III as a defensive quality control coach.

Arrivals

The Jets signed JoJo Dickson, Tevita Finau, Jaiquawn Jarrett, Dennis Landolt, Royce Pollard, Titus Ryan, Matt Simms, and Jacquies Smith to reserve/future contracts on December 31, 2012.
The Jets signed Emmanuel Arceneaux, Bret Lockett, Claude Davis, and Joseph Collins to reserve/future contracts on January 2, 2013.
The Jets signed Travis Tripucka to a reserve/future contract on January 3, 2013.
The Jets signed Danny Lansanah and Cliff Harris to reserve/future contracts on January 4, 2013.
The Jets signed D. J. Young to a reserve/future contract on January 17, 2013.
The Jets signed Vidal Hazelton to a reserve/future contract on January 23, 2013.
The Jets signed Eric Crocker, Junior Aumavae, and Thomas Mayo on March 1, 2013.
The Jets signed David Garrard on March 11, 2013.
The Jets signed Mike Goodson, Willie Colon, and Antonio Garay on March 15, 2013.
The Jets signed Antwan Barnes on March 18, 2013.
The Jets signed Dawan Landry on April 9, 2013.
The Jets signed Ryan Quigley and Derek Dimke on April 11, 2013.
The Jets signed Calvin Pace on April 16, 2013.
The Jets signed Stephen Peterman on April 26, 2013.
The Jets signed undrafted free agents Zach Rogers, Ryan Spadola, K. J. Stoud, Antavious Wilson, Chris Pantale, Mike Shanahan, Dalton Freeman, Trey Gilleo, Mark Popek, Roosevelt Holliday, Jake McDonough, Troy Davis, Mike Edwards, and Rontez Miles on April 29, 2013.
The Jets signed Thomas Mayo, Lanier Coleman, Brett Maher, and Sean Progar-Jackson on May 12, 2013.
The Jets signed Marcus Davis on May 14, 2013.
The Jets signed Ben Obomanu on May 30, 2013.
The Jets signed Kellen Winslow II on June 14, 2013.
The Jets signed Billy Cundiff, Jeffrey Shugarts, and Pat Scales on July 23, 2013.
The Jets signed Leger Douzable on July 25, 2013.
The Jets signed Chad Spann on July 27, 2013.
The Jets signed Mossis Madu, Erik Cook, and Michael Campbell on August 4, 2013.
The Jets signed Kahlil Bell and Rahsaan Vaughn on August 11, 2013.
The Jets signed Patrick Ford on August 13, 2013.
The Jets claimed Scott Wedige off waivers on August 20, 2013. 
The Jets signed Marcus Rucker on August 21, 2013.
The Jets signed Mohamed Massaquoi on August 22, 2013.
The Jets re-signed Jason Smith on August 23, 2013.
The Jets signed Dan Carpenter on August 27, 2013.
The Jets signed Graham Harrell on August 28, 2013.
The Jets claimed Alex Green, Ben Ijalana and Scott Solomon off waivers and signed Michael Campbell, Troy Davis, Tevita Finau, Dalton Freeman, Rontez Miles, Chris Pantale, and J. B. Shugarts to the practice squad on September 1, 2013.
The Jets signed Brady Quinn on September 2, 2013.
The Jets signed Danny Lansanah and Junior Aumavae to the practice squad on September 3, 2013.
The Jets signed Brady Quinn to the active roster and Rahsaan Vaughn to the practice squad on September 9, 2013.
The Jets signed Ben Obomanu on September 10, 2013.
The Jets signed Ryan Quigley and Scott Solomon to the active roster and Danny Lansanah to the practice squad on September 16, 2013.
The Jets signed Kareem Huggins to the practice squad on September 25, 2013.
The Jets signed David Nelson to the active roster and Troy Davis to the practice squad on October 2, 2013.
The Jets claimed Zach Sudfeld off waivers on October 4, 2013.
The Jets signed Ricky Sapp to the active roster and T.J. Barnes to the practice squad on October 9, 2013.
The Jets signed Saalim Hakim to the practice squad and David Garrard on October 10, 2013.
The Jets signed Josh Cribbs and Greg Salas to the active roster and Miguel Maysonet to the practice squad on October 15, 2013.
The Jets signed Ras-I Dowling to the practice squad on October 23, 2013.
The Jets re-signed Rontez Miles to the practice squad on November 13, 2013.
The Jets signed Ed Reed on November 14, 2013.
The Jets signed Jermaine Cunningham on November 20, 2013.
The Jets re-signed Michael Campbell to the practice squad on November 27, 2013.
The Jets signed Darius Reynaud on December 3, 2013.
The Jets signed Tim Fugger to the practice squad on December 4, 2013.
The Jets signed Dwight Jones to the practice squad on December 18, 2013.

Departures
The Jets released Bart Scott, Calvin Pace, Eric Smith, Jason Smith, and waived Josh Baker on February 19, 2013.
The Jets released Sione Pouha on March 12, 2013.
The Jets waived Tim Tebow on April 29, 2013.
The Jets waived Cliff Harris, Claude Davis, and D. J. Young on April 30, 2013.
The Jets waived Emmanuel Arceneaux and Thomas Mayo on May 7, 2013.
The Jets released Roosevelt Holliday, Derek Dimke, and Royce Pollard on May 12, 2013.
The Jets released Antavious Wilson on May 14, 2013.
The Jets placed David Garrard on the reserve/retired list on May 30, 2013.
The Jets released Travis Tripucka on June 17, 2013.
The Jets released Brett Maher, Thomas Mayo, and Mark Popek on July 23, 2013.
The Jets waived Jake McDonough from the active roster and Thomas Mayo from injured reserve on July 25, 2013.
The Jets released Jordan White and Eric Crocker on August 4, 2013.
The Jets released Marcus Davis on August 5, 2013.
The Jets released Vidal Hazelton on August 7, 2013.
The Jets waived John Griffin on August 11, 2013.
The Jets released Dennis Landolt on August 13, 2013.
The Jets released Titus Ryan and Mike Shanahan on August 22, 2013.
The Jets released Scott Wedige on August 23, 2013.
The Jets released Joe McKnight, Braylon Edwards, Hayden Smith, Chad Spann, Patrick Ford, Trey Gilleo, Stephen Peterman, Joseph Collins, Marcus Rucker, K. J. Stroud, Rahsaan Vaughn, Sean Progar-Jackson, Donnie Fletcher, Bret Lockett, Ryan Quigley, and Patrick Scales on August 26, 2013.
The Jets released Billy Cundiff on August 27, 2013.
The Jets released Dalton Freeman on August 28, 2013.
The Jets released Greg McElroy, Mossis Madu, Michael Campbell, Mohamed Massaquoi, Ben Obomanu, Zach Rogers, Chris Pantale, Erik Cook, J. B. Shugarts, Jason Smith, Junior Aumavae, Lanier Coleman, Tevita Finau, Antonio Garay, Troy Davis, JoJo Dickson, Jacquies Smith, Royce Adams, Mike Edwards, Rontez Miles, and Dan Carpenter on August 31, 2013.
The Jets released Kahlil Bell and Danny Lansanah on September 1, 2013.
The Jets released Graham Harrell on September 2, 2013.
The Jets released J. B. Shugarts from the practice squad on September 3, 2013.
The Jets released Brady Quinn on September 7, 2013.
The Jets released Danny Lansanah on September 9, 2013.
The Jets released Scott Solomon on September 10, 2013.
The Jets released Robert Malone from the active roster and Rahsaan Vaughn from the practice squad on September 16, 2013.
The Jets released Troy Davis from the practice squad on September 25, 2013.
The Jets released Kareem Huggins from the practice squad and Ben Obomanu from the active roster on October 2, 2013.
The Jets released Scott Solomon on October 4, 2013.
The Jets released Ryan Spadola and Ricky Sapp on October 5, 2013.
The Jets released Junior Aumavae from the practice squad on October 9, 2013.
The Jets released Brady Quinn on October 21, 2013.
The Jets released Miguel Maysonet from the practice squad on October 22, 2013.
The Jets released Rontez Miles on November 11, 2013.
The Jets released Ricky Sapp on November 14, 2013.

Trades

To Jets
Chris Ivory was traded from the New Orleans Saints to the Jets on April 26, 2013 in exchange for New York's fourth round selection (106th overall) in the 2013 NFL Draft.

From Jets
Darrelle Revis was traded to the Tampa Bay Buccaneers on April 21, 2013 in exchange for the Buccaneers' first round selection (13th overall) in the 2013 NFL Draft and a conditional pick in the 2014 NFL Draft.

Free Agents

2013 draft class

NOTES:
The Jets were not awarded any compensatory selections in the 2013 NFL Draft.

Preseason

Regular season

Schedule

Note: Intra-division opponents are in bold text.

Game summaries

Week 1: vs. Tampa Bay Buccaneers

This game marked the debut of 2013 second-round draft pick QB Geno Smith from West Virginia. However, Smith only stepped in as QB due to incumbent starter Mark Sanchez suffering an apparent shoulder injury. Smith's first game didn't start off on the right foot, as he fumbled after taking a sack from Buccaneers MLB Mason Foster, and threw an interception to Buccaneers linebacker Lavonte David. Smith eventually rebounded by throwing his first career TD pass to Kellen Winslow Jr. to make the game close by halftime. The second half was a defensive struggle between both teams that wound up in both teams scoring in field goals. The biggest moment of the game came when Geno Smith scrambled out of bounds and Lavonte David (the same player who intercepted Smith earlier in the game) delivered a late hit to Smith in the last seconds of the game, resulting in a 15-yard unnecessary roughness penalty against David which pushed the Jets' position forward just enough to enable a successful 48-yard field goal from Nick Folk to secure victory.

With the win, the Jets improved to 1–0.

Week 2: at New England Patriots

Geno Smith had his worst game so far in his rookie season. After playing solidly in the first three quarters of the game against a mostly out-of-sync Patriots team (Tom Brady completed less than 50 percent of his passes for the first time since 2009), Geno Smith fell apart, throwing three interceptions in the fourth quarter alone; his third INT to Aqib Talib ultimately sealed the Jets' fate, as the Jets lost to the Patriots 13–10 in a sloppy matchup in Foxborough.

With the loss, the Jets fell to 1–1.

Week 3: vs. Buffalo Bills

In a matchup of fellow rookie quarterbacks Geno Smith and E.J. Manuel, the game started off well for the Jets as Geno Smith ran in the end zone for a TD, and accounted for another on a long strike to Stephen Hill. The defense was stingy, holding off E.J. Manuel and the Bills offense throughout the game leading into the third quarter, and Nick Folk delivered two successful field goals to create a 20–6 cushion at the beginning of the 3rd quarter. However, it was to be acknowledged that the Jets committed a team-record 20 penalties for 168 yards, which helped the Bills get back into the game by the 4th quarter. Eventually, Geno Smith stepped up under pressure and delivered a game-winning, 69-yard TD to Santonio Holmes. As a result, the Jets proved that they can win in the face of adversity.

Bilal Powell had a good day, rushing 27 times for 149 rushing yards.

With the stunning win, the Jets improve to 2–1.

Week 4: at Tennessee Titans

This was the Jets' only game outside of the Eastern Time Zone during the 2013 season. Following three touchdown throws, the Jets sacked Jake Locker out of the game in the third quarter as Locker was sidelined the next two weeks with a hip injury. Geno Smith was picked off twice while in the fourth quarter he was sacked at his own goal line by Karl Klug; he attempted to switch the ball behind his back and Klug fell on the fumble for a touchdown.

With the loss, the Jets fell to 2–2.

Week 5: at Atlanta Falcons

The Jets traveled to Atlanta to take on a depleted Falcons team on Monday Night Football. The Jets grabbed a 27-14 lead in the fourth quarter but back to back Falcons touchdowns took them to a 28–27 lead on a Matt Bryant field goal with 1:54 remaining in the game. From there the Jets marched down the field on four Geno Smith completions, a Smith run, and two Bilal Powell runs; the resulting field goal from Nick Folk as time expired won it 30-28. With the win, the Jets improved to 3–2.

Week 6: vs. Pittsburgh Steelers

The Jets came back home to face the winless Pittsburgh Steelers. The Jets struggled all afternoon as they lost 19–6, giving the Steelers their first win of the season. With the loss, the Jets fell to 3–3, and also fell to 4–19 all time against the Steelers.

Week 7: vs. New England Patriots

This game is well known for an infamous penalty that occurred during the overtime period. The Jets were lining up for a game winning 56-yard field goal in overtime to try and give them the win. Nick Folk kicked the ball, but the kick went wide right and the Patriots appeared to be taking over with a chance to win. However, Chris Jones of New England was called for a controversial unsportsmanlike conduct penalty after pushing his teammate into the offensive line. This penalty was later named "leaping". The penalty gave the Jets a first down, giving them three more downs to push the field goal attempt closer. This time, Folk drilled the kick from 42 yards, and the Jets came away with a win that improved them to 4–3.

Week 8: at Cincinnati Bengals

The Jets were thoroughly embarrassed as Andy Dalton threw five touchdowns and Pacman Jones scored on a 60-yard interception.  With the loss, the Jets fell to 4–4. They were also given their worst defeat since losing 45–3 to the Patriots in 2010.

Week 9: vs. New Orleans Saints

Rebounding from the embarrassing loss at Cincinnati, the Jets took down the 6–1 Saints, putting up 198 rushing yards while intercepting Drew Brees twice. Geno Smith completed just eight passes for 115 yards but rushed for 18 yards and a score.

Week 11: at Buffalo Bills

After the win over the Saints, the Jets traveled to Buffalo to face the Bills. The Jets never led during the game, as the Bills commanded the game from start to finish, winning 37–14. Geno Smith was intercepted three times and ended up posting an overall passer rating of 10.1. With the loss, the Jets fell to 5–5.

Week 12: at Baltimore Ravens

For the second time this season and second time against an AFC North opponent, the Jets failed to score a touchdown, as they lost 19–3 to the Baltimore Ravens. Geno Smith was intercepted twice and for the second straight week and third time in the last four, failed to throw a touchdown pass. With the loss, the Jets fell to 5–6.

Week 13: vs. Miami Dolphins

For the second straight week, the Jets did not score a touchdown, as they managed only a field goal in a 23–3 loss to Miami. Geno Smith did not start in this game, as he was benched and replaced by Matt Simms. Simms did not do much of a better job, as he, like Smith, failed to throw a touchdown pass. Smith came in later on, but only went 4 for 10 throwing the ball and ended with a passer rating of 8.3. With the loss, the Jets fell to 5–7.

Week 14: vs. Oakland Raiders

For the first time in two weeks, New York scored a touchdown. Geno Smith returned to action as starting quarterback and threw a touchdown pass and an interception as the Jets defeated the Oakland Raiders 37–27. With the win, the Jets improved to 6–7 and kept their slim playoff hopes alive.

Week 15: at Carolina Panthers

With the loss, the Jets fell to 6–8, and were mathematically eliminated from playoff contention for the third straight season after the Ravens defeated the Lions the following Monday night, therefore rendering them unable to play on their home turf in the Super Bowl. The Jets were seeking their first win in Charlotte since 2001.

Week 16: vs. Cleveland Browns

In a game that had no impact on the AFC playoff picture, the Jets managed a 24–13 win over the Cleveland Browns. Geno Smith committed no turnovers and threw two touchdowns in the win, which improved the Jets to 7–8.

Week 17: at Miami Dolphins

The Jets traveled to Miami to end their season. The Jets beat Miami 20–7 to end the Dolphins playoff hopes. Geno Smith did not throw a touchdown, but he also did not turn it over. The Jets forced three Miami turnovers in the game. With the win, the Jets ended their season at an even 8–8.  It was also the Jets’ 13th win against the Dolphins in their last 24 meetings and seventh in that span at Joe Robbie Stadium.

Standings

Division

Conference

Staff

Final roster

References

External links

2013 New York Jets at Pro Football Reference

New York Jets
New York Jets seasons
New York Jets season
21st century in East Rutherford, New Jersey
Meadowlands Sports Complex